Lo Uk Tsuen or Lo Uk is the name or part of the name of several villages in Hong Kong, including:

 Lo Uk Tsuen (Ha Tsuen), in the Ha Tsuen area of Yuen Long District
 Lo Uk Tsuen (Tsing Yi), on Tsing Yi island
 Pui O Lo Uk Tsuen, on Lantau Island
 Wang Toi Shan Lo Uk Tsuen, in the Pat Heung area of Yuen Long District